Abdulkareem Aiedh Al-Qahtani (born 9 February 1993) is a Saudi footballer who plays as a midfielder for Al-Wehda.

Club career

Al-Hilal
In 2015, Abdulkareem was promoted to the first team from the academy team. On 12 May, he played his debut in last fixture of the league against Al-Faisaly which ended 0-0.

Al-Raed (loan)
On 4 July 2016, Abdulkareem went on loan to Al-Raed. He played his debut for Al-Raed against Ittihad. He scored his first goal in professional football on 20 October against Al-Faisaly which made them win 0-1. After that match, he scored again against Ettifaq, That match ended 0-2. His first yellow card was against Al-Ahli. Al-Raed wanted to renew the loan because of his great form, but he refused and wanted to go back. He ended his loan on 30 June 2017.

Al-Fayha
On 5 August 2017, Al-Fayha signed Abdulkareem Al-Qahtani for an undisclosed fee with a three-year contract.

Al-Tai
On 31 August 2021, Al-Qahtani joined Al-Tai on loan from Al-Wehda.

International career
In 2014, Abdulkareem was chosen to play for Saudi Arabia U-23 in the Asian Games. He played his debut for Saudi Arabia against Qatar in 2014 WAFF Championship as a substitute in the 64 minute, they lost the match 4-1.

Statistics
As of 2 February 2018

Hounors

Al-Hilal
Saudi Crown Prince Cup (1): 2015–16

References

External links
 

1993 births
Living people
Saudi Arabian footballers
Saudi Arabia youth international footballers
Al Hilal SFC players
Al-Raed FC players
Al-Fayha FC players
Al-Wehda Club (Mecca) players
Al-Tai FC players
Saudi Professional League players
Footballers at the 2014 Asian Games
Association football midfielders
Asian Games competitors for Saudi Arabia
21st-century Saudi Arabian people
20th-century Saudi Arabian people